Munawar Zarif (Punjabi) (25 December 1940 – 29 April 1976) was a Pakistani film actor and comedian. His fans named him Shahenshah-e-Zarafat 
(), meaning The Emperor of Humor or the King of Humor. 

He was one of the most popular and highest paid actors of the 1970s and is considered one of the greatest comedians of South Asia.

Early life and career
Munawar Zarif was born on 2 February 1940 in Gujranwala, Punjab. He started his film career with a Punjabi film Dandian (1961). His breakthrough film was 1964's Hath Jori. After starting as a comedian, he was promoted to playing second leads starting with the film Parday Mein Rehnay Do (1973). Subsequently, he was cast as the lead actor in films such as Banarsi Thug (1973) and Jeera Blade (1973). Possibly his most popular role was in 1974's Naukar Wohti Da, which became a runaway hit. 

He received his first Nigar Award in "Special Award" category for his performance in Ishaq Deewana (1971). He won the Nigar Award in the "Best Comedian" category for Baharo Phool Barsao (1972) and Zeenat (1975). He appeared in more than 300 films in the span of just 15 years from 1961 to 1976. He was well-known for his Ad-Lib dialogue delivery.

Personal life
Munawar Zarif was the younger brother of comedian Zarif (1924-1960), famous in the 50s for being the first comedian in Pakistan's cinema to play lead roles, while his other brothers Rasheed Zarif (1946-1974) and Majeed Zarif (1942-2012) were also comedians in movies. Another elder brother was Munir Zarif, a film and TV actor famous for his roles in serials like Sona Chandi, Aalif Laila and Ainak Wala Jin, who passed away in 2014.  

He was lifelong friend of fellow comedian Ali Ejaz.  

His only son Faisal Munawar Zarif debuted as an actor with Puttar Munawar Zareef Da in 1993, followed by other movies like Puttar Jeeray Blade Da (1994) and Khotay Sikay (1995), but he couldn't find success in the film industry, so he moved to England before relocating to Morocco after marrying a Moroccan woman, where he died in 2019 of cardiac arrest at the age of 44.

Death

Zarif's family announced his death in Pakistan, on 29 April 1976. He died in Lahore due to cirrhosis of the liver. He was laid to rest at Bibi Pak Daman Cemetery, Lahore.

Legacy
Munawar Zarif is often regarded as one of the greatest comedians ever in Pakistani films. Fellow comedian and friend Ali Ejaz recalled his ability to improvise lines on the spot and called him an 'extempore' comedian. Radio Pakistan Multan programme manager Asif Khan Khaitran reminisced about the success of Munawar Zarif and said: "There was a time in his career when writers would develop script with Munawar Zarif's personality in mind." Comedian Umer Shareef called him "Mount Everest" of comedy and said that "for attaining fame in the field of comedy one must follow Munwer Zareef’s School of thought."

Filmography

1960s

1970s

Awards and honours
Nigar Awards

 Nigar Awards 1971 - Special Award for Ishq Deevana 
 Nigar Awards 1972 - Best Comedian for Baharo Phool Barsao
 Nigar Awards 1975 - Best Comedian for Zeenat

See also
List of Pakistani actors

References

External links
Munawar Zarif at the Internet Movie Database

1940 births
1976 deaths
Pakistani male film actors
Pakistani male comedians
Male actors from Lahore
Punjabi people
People from Gujranwala
Nigar Award winners
20th-century Pakistani male actors
20th-century comedians